Najafabad is a city in Isfahan Province, Iran.

Najafabad may also refer to:

Chaharmahal and Bakhtiari Province

Fars Province
Najafabad, Abadeh, a village in Abadeh County
Najafabad, Arsanjan, a village in Arsanjan County
Najafabad, Firuzabad, a village in Firuzabad County
Najafabad, Meymand, a village in Firuzabad County
Najafabad, Larestan, a village in Larestan County
Najafabad, Pasargad, a village in Pasargad County
Najafabad, Qir and Karzin, a village in Qir and Karzin County

Hamadan Province
Najafabad, Asadabad, a village in Asadabad County
Najafabad, Tuyserkan, a village in Tuyserkan County

Hormozgan Province
Najafabad, Hormozgan, a village in Hajjiabad County

Isfahan Province
Najafabad, Nain, a village in Nain County
Najafabad, a city in Najafabad County
Najafabad, Semirom, a village in Semirom County
Najafabad, alternate name of Aghdash, Isfahan, a village in Semirom County
Najafabad County, an administrative subdivision of Iran

Kerman Province
Najafabad, former name of Najaf Shahr, a city in Kerman Province, Iran
Najafabad, Jiroft, a village in Jiroft County
Najafabad, Kuhbanan, a village in Kuhbanan County
Najafabad Rural District (Kerman Province), in Sirjan County

Kermanshah Province
Najafabad, Kermanshah, a village in Kermanshah County
Najafabad, Sonqor, a village in Sonqor County

Kohgiluyeh and Boyer-Ahmad Province
Najafabad, Kohgiluyeh and Boyer-Ahmad, a village in Boyer-Ahmad County

Kurdistan Province
Najafabad, Bijar, a village in Bijar County
Najafabad, Kamyaran, a village in Kamyaran County
Najafabad, Qorveh, a village in Qorveh County
Najafabad Rural District (Kurdistan Province), in Bijar County

Lorestan Province
Najafabad, Aligudarz, a village in Aligudarz County
Najafabad, Khorramabad, a village in Khorramabad County

Markazi Province
Najafabad, Ashtian, a village in Ashtian County
Najafabad, Shazand, a village in Shazand County
Najafabad, Zarandieh, a village in Zarandieh County
Najafabad, alternate name of Soheyl Najafabad, a village in Zarandieh County

North Khorasan Province
Najafabad, Bojnord, a village in Bojnord County
Najafabad, Faruj, a village in Faruj County

Qazvin Province
Najafabad, Buin Zahra, a village in Buin Zahra County
Najafabad, Qazvin, a village in Qazvin County
Najafabad, Tarom Sofla, a village in Qazvin County

Razavi Khorasan Province
Najafabad, Dargaz, a village in Dargaz County
Najafabad, Firuzeh, a village in Firuzeh County

Tehran Province
Najafabad, Tehran, a village in Varamin County

West Azerbaijan Province
Najafabad, West Azerbaijan, a village in Urmia County

Yazd Province
Najafabad, Yazd, a village in Taft County

See also
Najafabad Rural District (disambiguation)